John Mulcahy may refer to:

John Mulcahy (businessman), former Australian CEO of the Suncorp Group.
John Mulcahy (journalist), Irish founder of The Phoenix magazine.
John Mulcahy (rower), American gold-medal Olympic rower.